Quednau may refer to:

the German name for Severnaya Gora, Russia
Marion Quednau (born 1952), Canadian author